Bobby May (born Ludwig Theodore Mayer, February 20, 1907–November 7, 1981) was a vaudeville-era juggler. He is considered one of the best American jugglers.

Biography
Bobby May was born in Cleveland, Ohio.
 
Bobby May performed his first professional act at Cleveland's Luna Park in 1923 along with a young Bob Hope.

One of May's most well-known acts involved juggling while ice-skating, which involved the use of three to five balls, clubs, hats, and cigarettes.

May was known for playing the harmonica as well as singing and dancing.

See also
List of jugglers

References

Further material
Bobby May: The Great American Juggler, a film by Stewart Lippe

External links
Juggling Hall of Fame entry for Bobby May

Jugglers
Vaudeville performers
1907 births
1981 deaths